Artegna  is a comune (municipality) in the Province of Udine in the Italian region Friuli-Venezia Giulia, located about  northwest of Trieste and about  northwest of Udine.

Artegna borders the following municipalities: Buja, Gemona del Friuli, Magnano in Riviera and Montenars.

Demographic evolution

Images

References

External links
 www.comune.artegna.ud.it/

Cities and towns in Friuli-Venezia Giulia
Articles which contain graphical timelines